Boatswain's Mate Charles Bradley (born 1838) was an Irish sailor who fought in the American Civil War. He was honored with the award on 3 April 1863.

Biography
Bradley was born in Ireland in 1838. He enlisted in the Navy from New York, and was assigned to the USS Louisville.

Medal of Honor
Carrying out his duties through the thick of battle and acting as captain of a 9-inch gun, Bradley consistently showed, "Attention to duty, bravery, and coolness in action against the enemy."

See also

List of American Civil War Medal of Honor recipients: A–F

References

1838 births
Irish-born Medal of Honor recipients
People of New York (state) in the American Civil War
Union Navy officers
United States Navy Medal of Honor recipients
American Civil War recipients of the Medal of Honor
Year of death missing